Dersaei is the name of a Thracian tribe. They are mentioned by Herodotus. They were allied with the Maedi tribe against the Getae during their campaign with the Romans in 75 BC.

References

Ancient tribes in the Balkans
Thracian tribes